A shadirvan is a type of fountain that is usually built in the courtyard or near the entrance of mosques, caravanserais, khanqahs, and madrasas, with the main purpose of providing water for drinking or ritual ablutions to several people at the same time, but also as decorative visual or sound elements.

Shadirvan are Persian in origin and, with a curtain or drape, were originally placed in the tents of rulers or on the balconies of palaces. They are a typical element of Ottoman architecture.

See also
 Cantharus, a similar fountain in Christian places of worship
 Howz
 Sebil or sabil, public water fountain in Islamic countries

References

External links

Fountains
Islamic architectural elements
Water and religion